Maintain involves functional checks and servicing.

Maintain may also refer to:
Maintainability, the ease in engineering
Olu Maintain, a Nigerian artist
"Maintain" (song), a 2018 single by Belly featuring Nav

See also
Maintenance (disambiguation)